Attauyo "Ty" Nsekhe  (born October 27, 1985) is an American football offensive tackle who is a free agent. He played college football at Texas State. He signed with the Corpus Christi Sharks of AF2 as an undrafted free agent in 2009.

Professional career
Nsekhe began his professional career in the Arena Football League (AFL) in 2009 when he was selected for the Corpus Christi Sharks. He played in the AFL from 2009-2012.  In the summer of 2012, he came to the attention of the Indianapolis Colts. He was selected by the Colts as a free agent on August 1, 2012.  He was signed by the St. Louis Rams on the active roster on September 2, 2012.  Nsekhe was later released to the Rams' practice squad on September 27, 2012 and released by the team on August 31, 2013.  Nsekhe has played in 6 of 8 regular season games for the Redskins in 2015, making first his career start vs the Jets.

Corpus Christi Sharks
In 2009, he signed with the Corpus Christi Sharks of the AF2.

Dallas Vigilantes
He signed with the Dallas Vigilantes of the Arena Football League.

Philadelphia Soul
On March 1, 2011, he was signed by the Philadelphia Soul of the Arena Football League.

San Antonio Talons
On April 26, 2012, he signed with the San Antonio Talons of the Arena Football League.

Indianapolis Colts
On August 1, 2012, he signed with the Indianapolis Colts of the National Football League after the team released OT Ben Ijalana. On September 1, 2012, he was released.

St. Louis Rams
On September 2, 2012, he was claimed off waivers by the St. Louis Rams. On September 27, 2012, he was released after team claimed Joseph Barksdale off waivers. On September 29, 2012, he was signed to the team's practice squad. On August 31, 2013, he was released.

New Orleans Saints
On January 6, 2014, the New Orleans Saints signed Nsekhe to a reserve/futures contract. The Saints released Nsekhe on August 25, 2014, then placed on the injured reserve list after clearing waivers.  On September 9, 2014, the Saints waived Nsekhe from injured reserve list on a no-recall basis.

Montreal Alouettes
Nsekhe was signed to the Montreal Alouettes' practice roster on October 4, 2014.

Washington Redskins
On February 10, 2015, Nsekhe signed with the Washington Redskins. He was waived by the Redskins on May 4.

Los Angeles KISS
On May 6, 2015, Nsekhe was assigned to the Los Angeles KISS.

Second stint with Redskins

On May 11, 2015, Nsekhe re-signed with the Washington Redskins. Nsekhe was the swing tackle for the Redskins in 2015, getting two starts at left tackle and some playing time at right tackle.

Nsekhe served as the Redskins' swing tackle again in 2016 and even started four games at left tackle in place of the suspended Trent Williams.

On February 28, 2017, Nsekhe re-signed with the Redskins.

On March 12, 2018, the Redskins placed a second-round restricted free agent tender on Nsekhe.

Buffalo Bills
On March 13, 2019, Nsekhe signed a two-year, $14.5 million deal including $7.7 million in guarantees with the Buffalo Bills.

Dallas Cowboys
On March 22, 2021, Nsekhe signed a one-year contract with the Dallas Cowboys.

Indianapolis Colts (second stint)
On October 11, 2022, Nsekhe was signed to the Indianapolis Colts practice squad.

Los Angeles Rams (Second Stint)
On October 18, 2022, Nsheke was signed by the Los Angeles Rams off the practice squad of the Indianapolis Colts.

Personal life
On September 23, 2013, Nsekhe was the subject of a controversy after he responded to a tweet that read, "Hard to believe that a player in a helmet defendin' a football makes more money than a soldier in a helmet defendin' his country." He responded, "It doesn't take much skill to kill someone". Although Nsekhe's tweet was deleted, the story went viral, eventually moving from blogs to the mainstream media. On September 24, the Rams issued a statement rejecting Nsekhe's expressed opinion and emphasizing that he had no connection with the team after having been released on August 31.  Nsekhe also issued his own apology via Twitter.

References

External links
 Dallas Cowboys bio
 Montreal Alouettes bio

1985 births
Living people
American football offensive tackles
Dallas Vigilantes players
Philadelphia Soul players
San Antonio Talons players
St. Louis Rams players
New Orleans Saints players
Washington Redskins players
Buffalo Bills players
Texas State Bobcats football players
Sportspeople from Akwa Ibom State
Sportspeople from Arlington, Texas
Sportspeople from Brooklyn
Players of American football from New York City
Players of American football from Texas
Los Angeles Kiss players
Los Angeles Rams players
Corpus Christi Sharks players
American sportspeople of Nigerian descent
Dallas Cowboys players
Indianapolis Colts players